Merel Conijn (born 19 October 2001) is a Dutch allround speed skater.

Career
Conijn won the Dutch Junior Allround Championships in 2019. She won the gold medal in the team pursuit event at the 2020 World Junior Speed Skating Championships in Tomaszów Mazowiecki together with Robin Groot and Femke Kok. Conijn won the 2022 Dutch Allround Championships which qualified her for the 2022 World Allround Championships in Hamar.

In 2021 she became a member of Team Worldstream-Corendon.

Records

Personal records

 

At the end of the 2021–22 season, Conijn occupied the 33rd position on the Adelskalender with a score of 159.311 points

Tournament overview

References

External links
Team Worldstream-Corendon profile
SpeedSkatingNews profile
ISU profile

2001 births
Living people
Dutch female speed skaters
Sportspeople from Amsterdam
21st-century Dutch women